An antiseptic ( and ) is an antimicrobial substance or compound that is applied to living tissue to reduce the possibility of infection, sepsis, or putrefaction. Antiseptics are generally distinguished from antibiotics by the latter's ability to safely destroy bacteria within the body, and from disinfectants, which destroy microorganisms found on non-living objects.

Antibacterials include antiseptics that have the proven ability to act against bacteria. Microbicides which destroy virus particles are called viricides or antivirals. Antifungals, also known as antimycotics, are pharmaceutical fungicides used to treat and prevent mycosis (fungal infection).

Surgery

The widespread introduction of antiseptic surgical methods was initiated by the publishing of the paper Antiseptic Principle of the Practice of Surgery in 1867 by Joseph Lister, which was inspired by Louis Pasteur's germ theory of putrefaction. In this paper, Lister advocated the use of carbolic acid (phenol) as a method of ensuring that any germs present were killed. Some of this work was anticipated by:
 Ancient Greek physicians Galen and Hippocrates as well as Sumerian clay tablets dating from 2150 BC that advocate the use of similar techniques.
 Medieval surgeons Hugh of Lucca, Theoderic of Servia, and his pupil Henri de Mondeville were opponents of Galen's opinion that pus was important to healing, which had led ancient and medieval surgeons to let pus remain in wounds. They advocated draining and cleaning the wound edges with wine, dressing the wound after suturing, if necessary  and leaving the dressing on for ten days, soaking it in warm wine all the while, before changing it. Their theories were bitterly opposed by Galenist Guy de Chauliac and others trained in the classical tradition.
 Oliver Wendell Holmes, Sr., who published The Contagiousness of Puerperal Fever in 1843
 Florence Nightingale, who contributed substantially to the report of the Royal Commission on the Health of the Army (1856–1857), based on her earlier work
 Ignaz Semmelweis, who published his work The Cause, Concept and Prophylaxis of Childbed Fever in 1861, summarizing experiments and observations since 1847

Some common antiseptics

Antiseptics can be subdivided into about eight classes of materials.  These classes can be subdivided according to their mechanism of action: small molecules that indiscriminately react with organic compounds and kill microorganisms (peroxides, iodine, phenols) and more complex molecules that disrupt the cell walls of the bacteria.
 Phenols such as phenol itself (as introduced by Lister) and triclosan, hexachlorophene, chlorocresol, and chloroxylenol. The latter is used for skin disinfection and cleaning surgical instruments. It is also used within a number of household disinfectants and wound cleaners.
 Diguanides including chlorhexidine gluconate, a bacteriocidal antiseptic which (with an alcoholic solvent) is the most safe & effective antiseptic for reducing the risk of infection after clean surgery, including tourniquet-controlled upper limb surgery. It is also used in mouthwashes to treat inflammation of the gums (gingivitis).  Polyhexanide (polyhexamethylene biguanide, PHMB) is an antimicrobial compound suitable for clinical use in critically colonized or infected acute and chronic wounds. The physicochemical action on the bacterial envelope prevents or impedes the development of resistant bacterial strains.
 Quinolines such as hydroxyquinolone, dequalium chloride, or chlorquinaldol.
 Alcohols, including ethanol and 2-propanol/isopropanol are sometimes referred to as surgical spirit. They are used to disinfect the skin before injections, among other uses.
 Peroxides, such as hydrogen peroxide and benzoyl peroxide. Commonly, 3% solutions of hydrogen peroxide have been used in household first aid for scrapes, etc.  However, the strong oxidization causes scar formation and increases healing time during fetal development.
 Iodine, especially in the form of povidone-iodine, is widely used because it is well tolerated; does not negatively affect wound healing; leaves a deposit of active iodine, thereby creating the so-called "remnant", or persistent effect; and has wide scope of antimicrobial activity. The traditional iodine antiseptic is an alcohol solution (called tincture of iodine) or as Lugol's iodine solution. Some studies  do not recommend disinfecting minor wounds with iodine because of concern that it may induce scar tissue formation and increase healing time. However, concentrations of 1% iodine or less have not been shown to increase healing time and are not otherwise distinguishable from treatment with saline. Iodine will kill all principal pathogens and, given enough time, even spores, which are considered to be the most difficult form of microorganisms to be inactivated by disinfectants and antiseptics.
 Octenidine dihydrochloride, currently increasingly used in continental Europe, often as a chlorhexidine substitute.
 Quat salts such as benzalkonium chloride/Lidocaine (trade name Bactine among others), cetylpyridinium chloride, or cetrimide. These surfactants disrupt cell walls.

See also
 Actinonin
 Henry Jacques Garrigues, introduced antiseptic obstetrics to North America
 NASLA (Nanostructured Anti-septical Coatings) Project

References

External links
 

 
Bactericides